The following lists of copper mines in the United States:

Leading copper-producing mines
Leading copper-producing mines in the U.S., 2018-2021, in order of output:  The mines on this list account for more than 99% of U.S. mine copper production.

Copper-mining projects not yet in production

Inactive or defunct copper mines
There are hundreds of inactive or defunct copper mines in the United States.  The list below includes only those with Wikipedia articles.

See also
 Copper mining
 Copper mining in the United States

References

 
Copper mines